The Motorola Television Hour is an hour-long anthology series which alternated bi-weekly with The United States Steel Hour on ABC. The show premiered on November 3, 1953, and was last aired on June 1, 1954. It was produced by Herbert Brodkin and sponsored by Motorola.  Writers included Neil Simon, Rod Serling, and William McCleery.  Its directors were Daniel Petrie, Ralph Nelson, and Don Richardson. The series aired live from New York City

Episode list

Notable guest actors
Actors appearing on the series included:
Eddie Albert
Jackie Cooper
Hume Cronyn
Cedric Hardwicke
Helen Hayes
Oscar Homolka
Brian Keith
Lisa Kirk
Lee Marvin
Walter Matthau
Jack Palance
Roberta Peters
John Raitt
Tony Randall
Basil Rathbone
Maria Riva
Phyllis Thaxter
Christopher Walken
Jane Wyatt

References

External links

The Motorola Television Hour Atomic Attack on Archive.org
The Motorola Television Hour at CVTA with list of episodes

1950s American anthology television series
1953 American television series debuts
1954 American television series endings
American Broadcasting Company original programming
Black-and-white American television shows
English-language television shows
American live television series